Edmund FitzGibbon was an Irish nobleman.

Edmund FitzGibbon may also refer to:

Edmund Fitzgibbon (bishop)
Edmund Gerald FitzGibbon, barrister and town clerk of Melbourne